Lyndsay McIntosh (born 1955, Glasgow) is a Scottish politician. She was a Conservative and Unionist Member of the Scottish Parliament (MSP) for the Central Scotland region from 1999 to 2003.

After being elected to Holyrood she was the Conservative deputy spokeswoman on home affairs. Prior to the 2003 election she was moved from first to third place on the Conservative's list for Central Scotland. After parliament was dissolved she followed her colleague Keith Harding and defected to the newly formed Scottish People's Alliance. She subsequently fought Kilmarnock and Loudoun for the SPA but came in a very poor eighth place with only 371 votes (1.2%).

She became a member of the national policy committee of the New Party, the successor to the SPA.

References

External links 
 
 Lyndsay McIntosh MSP biography at the Scottish Parliament website

1955 births
Living people
Politicians from Glasgow
Conservative MSPs
Members of the Scottish Parliament 1999–2003
Female members of the Scottish Parliament
20th-century Scottish women politicians